Marisa C. Kozlowski (born 1967) is an American chemist who is Professor of Organic and Catalysis Chemistry at the University of Pennsylvania. Her research considers asymmetric synthesis and the development of cost effective catalysts. She was elected Fellow of the American Association for the Advancement of Science in 2012 and American Chemical Society in 2013.

Early life and education 
Kozlowski was born in Hamburg, and raised in Liverpool, New York. She studied chemistry at Cornell University. She moved to California for her graduate studies, where she joined the laboratory of Paul Bartlett at the University of California, Berkeley. As an undergraduate, she only knew of one woman member of faculty, and as a postgraduate only two. Her research considered the design of enzyme inhibitors. She moved to Harvard University as a postdoctoral research fellow, where she worked with David A. Evans on organic synthesis.

Research and career 
In 1997, Kozlowski joined the faculty at the University of Pennsylvania, where she was eventually promoted to Professor of Chemistry. Kozlowski studies asymmetric high throughput synthesis and novel approaches to catalysis. She has developed computational programs to better understand chemical reactions. These programs make use of machine learning and electronic structure calculations to iteratively design new synthesis protocols.

Kozlowski was made Associate Editor of The Journal of Organic Chemistry in 2013, and Editor-in-Chief of Organic Letters in 2021.

Awards and honors 
 1998 DuPont Young Investigator Award
 2001 National Science Foundation CAREER Award
 2002 Alfred P. Sloan Research Fellowship
 2002 American Cancer Society Beginning Research Scholar Award
 2010 Philadelphia Organic Chemists’ Club Award
 2012 Elected Fellow of the American Association for the Advancement of Science
 2013 Elected Fellow of the American Chemical Society
 2021 Appointed Editor-in-Chief of Organic Letters

Selected publications

References 

Living people
1965 births
Cornell University alumni
American women chemists
Fellows of the American Association for the Advancement of Science
University of California, Berkeley alumni
Fellows of the American Chemical Society
Academic journal editors
Scientists from Hamburg
21st-century American women